Wampar Rural LLG is a local-level government (LLG) located in the Markham Valley of Morobe Province, Papua New Guinea. The Wampar language is spoken in the LLG, along with Labu, Yalu (Aribwaung), Watut, and other Markham languages.

Wards
01. Mare (Wampar language speakers)
02. Wampit (Wampar language speakers)
03. Gabensis (Wampar language speakers)
04. Omisi
05. Markham Bridge
06. Labutale (Labu language speakers)
07. Labumiti (Labu language speakers)
08. Labubutu (Labu language speakers)
09. 5 Mile
10. St Joseph
11. Awillunga
12. Bubia
13. Busanim
14. Yalu (Aribwaung language speakers)
15. Munum (Wampar language speakers)
16. Nasuapum (Wampar language speakers)
17. Gapsongkeg (Wampar language speakers) - including historic World War II site of Nadzab
18. Naromangki
19. Chivasing (Wampar language speakers)
20. Tararan (Wampar language speakers)
21. Noa
22. Bogeba
23. Irumu
24. Uruf (North Watut language speakers)
25. Tsilitsili (Middle Watut language speakers)
26. Maralina (Middle Watut language speakers)
27. Maralangko (South Watut language speakers)

References

Local-level governments of Morobe Province